SeaPort Manatee is a county-owned deepwater seaport located in the eastern Gulf of Mexico at the entrance to Tampa Bay in northern Manatee County, Florida. It is one of Florida's largest deepwater seaports and also regarded as the closest U.S. deepwater seaport to the Panama Canal. The port handles a variety of bulk, breakbulk, containerized, and heavy-lift project cargoes.

History
Manatee County bought  in 1965 to launch a Barge Port and Industrial Port which later became known as Port Manatee. The Florida Legislature established the Manatee County Port Authority (MCPA) which is the governing body for the port, in the same year. 

The first ship to dock at the port was M/V Fermland on August 7, 1970, unloading 2,000 tons of "Korean plywood". A formal dedication ceremony for the port was held on October 29, 1970 at 2 pm. After the opening ceremony, an open house was held that day allowing members of the general public to visit the port. This open house was held for two more days after the opening ceremony occurred. In the 1970s the port was mainly involved with petroleum and phosphate.

By the 1980s the port become more diversified. Berth 11 was built and Berth 12 played a role in rebuilding the Sunshine Skyway Bridge. Between 1993 and 2003, the MS Regal Empress from Regal Cruises sailed out of Port Manatee from Berth 9. A 50th anniversary celebration was scheduled in 2020 but ended up being cancelled because of the COVID-19 pandemic.

In February 2022, the port was rebranded as SeaPort Manatee.

Imports and exports 
The port handles approximately 8 million tons of cargo each year.

Primary imports
Tropical fruits and vegetables
Citrus juices and beverages
Forestry products
Refined petroleum products
Finished phosphate fertilizers
Non-ferrous metals
Cement and cement clinker
Steel
Project cargo such as power plant and bridge components, heavy machinery, and over-sized vehicles

Primary exports
Finished phosphate products
Citrus Juices
Construction and road building equipment
Used vehicles
LNG Heat Exchangers
Power Generation Units

References

External links 
 

County government agencies in Florida
Ports and harbors of the Florida Gulf coast
Tampa Bay
Geography of Manatee County, Florida
1970 establishments in Florida
Transportation buildings and structures in Manatee County, Florida